Maqov (also, Makov) is a village and municipality in the Zaqatala Rayon of Azerbaijan.  It has a population of 4,321.  The municipality consists of the villages of Maqov, Abalı, Paşan, Yolayrıc, Oytala, and Voytala.

References

External links

Populated places in Zaqatala District